The 1968 RAC Tourist Trophy was a motor race which was held at the Oulton Park circuit, in Cheshire, England, on the 3 June. Although the 1967 race was part of the European Touring Car Championship, the 1968 and 33rd running of the RAC International Tourist Trophy Race saw a return to Group 7 sportscars. The world's oldest motor race was the fourth round of the 1968 British Sports Car Championship.

Report

Entry
The event attracted a total of 33 sports cars, with every entrant taking part in qualifying. Amongst the entries was the reigning World Drivers Champion, Denny Hulme.

Qualifying
Fresh from his second place in the 1968 Monaco Grand Prix, Richard Attwood took pole position for the Alan Mann Racing team, in their Ford P68, averaging a speed of 103.500 mph, around 2.761 miles circuit. Alongside Attwood would be Jo Bonnier, in his self-entered Lola T70.

Race
The race was held over 110 laps of the Oulton Park circuit. Denny Hulme took his Sid Taylor Racing prepared Lola T70 Mk.3 to his third TT win in four years, winning with an aggregated time of 3hrs 03:57.200mins., averaging a speed of 99.074 mph. Just 9.4 seconds behind in second place was David Piper, who shared his Ferrari 412 P with Richard Attwood. Attwood joined Piper following the demise of his pole winning Ford P68. Third place was attained by Paul Hawkins, in his Ford GT40, albeit one lap adrift.

Classification

Result

References

RAC Tourist Trophy
RAC Tourist Trophy
RAC Tourist Trophy